Park Young-sook (born December 18, 1988) is a South Korean table tennis player. She won two doubles titles at the ITTF World Tour, the first one was in 2009.

References 

1988 births
Living people
South Korean female table tennis players
Table tennis players at the 2014 Asian Games
World Table Tennis Championships medalists
Asian Games competitors for South Korea
21st-century South Korean women